James Bunce (1563–1632), of St. Benet Gracechurch, London, was an English politician.

He was a Member (MP) of the Parliament of England for City of London in 1628.

References

1563 births
1632 deaths
English MPs 1628–1629
Members of the Parliament of England for the City of London